...Es La Diferencia is a studio album released by Mexican ranchera performer Vicente Fernández in 1982. The album received a nomination for a Grammy Award for Best Mexican-American Performance.

Track listing

Notes
Credits adapted from AllMusic.

References

1982 albums
Vicente Fernández albums
Ranchera albums
Spanish-language albums
CBS Discos albums